Zeta Hydrae (ζ Hya, ζ Hydrae) is a solitary star in the equatorial constellation of Hydra. This is a generally faint constellation, so, at an apparent visual magnitude of +3.10, this is the third-brightest member after Alphard and Gamma Hydrae.

Distance
At this distance, the visual magnitude of the star is diminished by 0.03 as a result of extinction from intervening gas and dust. The star has one of the lower-error margin readings among those of the Gaia spacecraft which computes a parallax of 20.7182 ± 0.3925 mas and, if correct, a distance of 157 ± 3 light years.

Characteristics
With a stellar classification of G9 II-III, this is an evolved giant star that is radiating 132 times the luminosity of the Sun from its outer envelope at an effective temperature of 4,925 K. At this heat, the star glows with the yellow hue of a G-type star. The radius of this star, as measured using interferometry, is about 18 times the Sun's radius. It has an estimated 4.2 times the mass of the Sun and is around  old.

Name and etymology
This star, along with δ Hya (Lisan al Sudja), ε Hya, η Hya, ρ Hya and σ Hya (Minchir), were Ulug Beg's Min al Azʽal, "Belonging to the Uninhabited Spot". According to the catalogue of stars in the Technical Memorandum 33-507 - A Reduced Star Catalog Containing 537 Named Stars, Min al Azʽal or Minazal were the title for five stars:δ Hya as Minazal I, η Hya as Minazal II, ε Hya as Minazal III, ρ Hya as Minazal IV and ζ Hya as Minazal V (exclude σ Hya).

The people of Groote Eylandt called Unwala, "The Crab", for the star cluster including this star, δ Hya (Lisan al Sudja), ε Hya, η Hya, ρ Hya and σ Hya (Minchir).

References 

Hydrae, Zeta
Hydra (constellation)
Minazal V
Hydrae, 16
043813
G-type bright giants
076294
3547
Durchmusterung objects